Charles Adelbert McCall III (born April 19, 1970) is an American politician who currently serves as the Speaker of the Oklahoma House of Representatives. A member of the Republican Party, he represents the 22nd House District, which is located in southeastern Oklahoma.

Early life and education 
McCall was born on April 19, 1970 to Charles Andrew McCall and Barbara Ann McCall (née Clure), in Atoka, Oklahoma. He graduated from Atoka High School in 1988. He attended the University of Oklahoma, graduating in 1992 with a bachelor's degree in finance and economics. He became a licensed nursing home administrator in 1993 before earning an MBA in banking at the University of Colorado Boulder Graduate School of Banking, graduating in 2000.

Career

Early career 
Beginning in high school, McCall started working as a part-time bank teller at AmeriState Bank, a family-owned bank that was bought by his grandfather C.A. McCall in 1967. He became president of AmeriState in 2001 and CEO in 2008. McCall resigned from his positions as CEO and president in 2012 after being elected to the Oklahoma House of Representatives, but remained as chairman of the board.

From 2004 to 2005, McCall was a city councilman for Atoka's Ward 4 before serving as the mayor of Atoka from 2005 to 2012.

Oklahoma House of Representatives 
McCall was first elected to the Oklahoma House of Representatives in 2012, defeating Democrat Doris Row, of Sulphur and succeeding Wes Hilliard from Oklahoma's 22nd House District. He became the first Republican to be elected to that seat.

Speaker of the Oklahoma House of Representatives 
On May 2, 2016, the Republican caucus voted to have McCall as their next Speaker over House Appropriations and Budget Chairman Earl Sears of Bartlesville. He was elected Speaker-designate by the Republican caucus on November 15, one week after he was reelected to his seat in the November 8 elections. He was formally elected Speaker on January 3, the first day of the 55th Oklahoma Legislature.

In 2018, four other Republican members challenged McCall for the position of speaker. Three of the four withdrew before the vote, with Chad Caldwell of Enid left opposing McCall. On March 8, the Republican caucus reelected McCall as speaker in a closed-door vote.

Personal life 
In 1994, McCall married his wife, Stephanie Ann Hays, whom he met while they were students at the University of Oklahoma. Stephanie McCall, originally from Chickasha, Oklahoma, graduated with a degree and certification in elementary education in 1994 and formerly worked as a public school teacher in the Atoka Public School District. He and his wife have two sons: Chase (born c. 1999) and Carson (born c. 2002). He and his family attend the Cornerstone Church in Atoka, where he serves as a church elder and teacher.

Electoral history

2012 Oklahoma House of Representatives

2014 Oklahoma House of Representatives

2016 Oklahoma House of Representatives

References 

1970 births
21st-century American politicians
American bank presidents
Living people
Mayors of places in Oklahoma
Republican Party members of the Oklahoma House of Representatives
Oklahoma city council members
People from Atoka, Oklahoma
Speakers of the Oklahoma House of Representatives
University of Colorado Boulder alumni
University of Oklahoma alumni